John Harris (1680 – 28 August 1738) was Bishop of Llandaff from 1729 to 1738, as well as serving as Dean of Hereford Cathedral and of Wells Cathedral.

Life
Harris (the son of George Harris of Milford Haven, Pembrokeshire, Wales) was educated at Jesus College, Oxford, matriculating in 1697 and obtaining his Bachelor of Arts degree in 1701.  After being ordained, he became rector of Rudbaxton in Pembrokeshire, later becoming rector of Lampeter Velfrey (1708–1729).  He was appointed a Fellow of Oriel College, Oxford in 1728, the year in which he received the degree of Doctor of Divinity from the University of Cambridge, and became a canon of Canterbury Cathedral. He became vicar of Ticehurst, Surrey in 1729, before becoming Bishop of Llandaff later in the year. During his time as bishop, he was active in the restoration of the cathedral. He was also Dean of Hereford Cathedral from 1729 to 1736, then became Dean of Wells Cathedral, where he was buried after his death on 28 August 1738.

References

1680 births
1738 deaths
Bishops of Llandaff
Deans of Hereford
Deans of Wells
Alumni of Jesus College, Oxford
Fellows of Oriel College, Oxford
Burials at Wells Cathedral
18th-century Welsh Anglican bishops